The Sunset Empire Transportation District (SETD) provides federally funded rural intercity bus services in Clatsop County, Oregon. Sunset Empire Transportation is also known as 'The Bus'.

SETD also provides transit connections for the National Park Service and the Lewis and Clark National Historical Park, titled the Lewis and Clark Explorer Shuttle, through a $2.5 million Federal Transit Authority grant, and via a SAFETEA-LU Alternative Transportation in Parks and Public Lands grant.

SETD has also received funding through the TEA-21 appropriations act.

Routes

In April 2011, all routes except 10 and 101 were eliminated, and Saturday service was canceled, in response to severe budget shortfalls.

References 

Bus transportation in Oregon
Transportation in Clatsop County, Oregon
Transit agencies in Oregon